Kaunata Parish is an administrative unit of Rēzekne Municipality, Latvia.

Towns, villages and settlements of Kaunata parish

References

External links 
 Kownata in the Geographical Dictionary of the Kingdom of Poland

Parishes of Latvia
Rēzekne Municipality